Okenia barnardi is a species of sea slug, specifically a dorid nudibranch, a marine gastropod mollusc in the family Goniodorididae.

Distribution
This species was described from Japan. It has also been reported from Hong Kong.

Description
This Okenia has a narrow body and eight or nine pairs of curved lateral papillae. There is a single mid-dorsal papilla on the back, in front of the gills. The body is translucent and the back (mantle) is chestnut brown with white spots, the brown pigment becoming fainter in the middle of the back.

Ecology
The diet of this species is a bryozoan, which lives in shallow water.

Etymology
This species was named in honour of Keppel Harcourt Barnard who named a number of South African nudibranchs.

References

Goniodorididae
Gastropods described in 1937